MechAssault 2: Lone Wolf is a 2004 video game developed by Day 1 Studios and published by Microsoft Game Studios exclusively for the Xbox console. It is the sequel to 2002's MechAssault and is set in the BattleTech universe. Since the Xbox 360 is backwards-compatible with the Xbox, it can also run Lone Wolf.

Plot
After many searches, Major Natalia "Nat" Kerensky decides to base their testing operations in Dante City on the Planet Dante, using the blackmarketeers as a cover. One evening, as Foster and the MechWarrior (player) are returning to their workshop, mysterious craft enter the Dante airspace and a Stiletto BattleMech lands on the ground and starts searching for them. They successfully evade the Stiletto and make it back to the workshop, where Nat instructs the player use a new powered armor suit called the BattleArmor to stop the invaders. After this, hundreds of dropships enter Dante's atmosphere. Mysteriously, one of these dropships is shot down by the others. After fighting to the crash site, a strange new MechWarrior by the name of Alera emerges, a space pirate with a jumpship named the "Jezebel". Later, the MechWarrior escapes an enemy port, and steals an enemy tank from 3 soldiers in an attempt to infiltrate the enemy. An allied APC then comes out and follows the MechWarrior on his way. The tank must go through two scans to advance the level, but the "Passenger Scan" warns the enemies that it is a trick, and the MechWarrior and his allies must escape the port with a tank.

After several confrontations with the enemy, it is discovered that the aggressors seek to access the Lostech blueprints and prototypes stored in the data cores to create an unstoppable army of mechanised soldiers to obtain dominance over the Inner Sphere, starting with mass-producing the Ragnarok Prototype model that discovered in the first game.  

During the final mission, the MechWarrior with the aid of his allies uses the BattleArmor to destroy a half-complete giant BattleMech that uses all five of the data cores.

Gameplay
The player controls a variety of vehicles other than mechs.  These vehicles include tanks, powered armor, turrets, and VTOLs. The player can also leave their vehicle and plant explosives or roam as a human pilot and in this form can "hitch" rides on enemy and friendly vehicles. When on an enemy vehicle, the player can attempt a "neurohack", with the result of ejecting the pilot and taking over his vehicle if successful.

Development

Reception

The game received "favorable" reviews according to the review aggregation website Metacritic. GameSpot cited good visual effects, and overall good gameplay, specifically praising the multiplayer portion of the game, but also citing several drawbacks including repetitiveness in the single-player campaign, along with poor voice acting and "uninspired terrain graphics". IGN also cited good gameplay, especially the multiplayer portion of the game. Concerns included the lacking appeal of the singleplayer campaign, and bad environmental graphics. In Japan, where the game was ported for release on January 20, 2005, Famitsu gave it a score of one seven, one eight, and two sevens for a total of 29 out of 40.

The Times gave it a score of four stars out of five, saying, "Experienced gamers will have a blast in cyberspace, battling with other players from around the world, which pretty much justifies the cost of broadband on its own." Detroit Free Press gave it three stars out of four, calling it "A screaming, cursing, testosterone-soaked attack on your eyeballs and ears." However, The Sydney Morning Herald gave it three-and-a-half stars out of five, saying, "There are sufficient missions but little choice of objectives, ensuring the action starts to feel prematurely repetitive."

Notes

References

External links

2004 video games
BattleTech games
MechWarrior
Multiplayer online games
Video game sequels
Video games about mecha
Video games developed in the United States
Video games set on fictional planets
Xbox games
Xbox-only games
Wargaming Chicago-Baltimore